Dedicator of cytokinesis protein 10 (Dock10), also known as Zizimin3, is a large (~240 kDa) protein involved in intracellular signalling networks that in humans is encoded by the DOCK10 gene. It is a member of the DOCK-D subfamily of the DOCK family of guanine nucleotide exchange factors, which function as activators of small G proteins.

Discovery
Dock10 was identified via bioinformatic approaches as one of a family of evolutionarily conserved proteins (the DOCK family) that share significant sequence homology. Dock10 is expressed in peripheral blood leukocytes as well as in the brain, spleen, lung and thymus.

Structure and function
Dock10 shares the same domain arrangement as other members of the DOCK-D/Zizimin subfamily as well as a high level of sequence similarity. It contains a DHR2 domain that is involved in G protein binding and a DHR1 domain, which, in some DOCK family proteins, interacts with membrane phospholipids. Like other DOCK-D subfamily proteins Dock10 contains an N-terminal PH domain, which, in Dock9/Zizimin1, mediates recruitment to the plasma membrane. The DHR2 domain of Dock10 appears to bind to the small G proteins Cdc42, TC10 and TCL although these interactions are of low affinity.  The physiological role of Dock10 is poorly characterised, however a study in lymphocytes has shown that Dock10 expression is upregulated in B-lymphocytes and Chronic Lymphocytic Leukemia (CLL) cells in response to the cytokine IL-4. This suggests that Dock10 may have a role in B-cell activation and proliferation. Another study identified Dock10 as a protein that was overexpressed in some aggressive papillary thyroid carcinomas.

References

Further reading

External links